Taekwondo is among the sports which is being contested at the 2019 South Asian Games. Taekwondo is being hosted in the International Sports Complex, Satdobato between December 2 and 5, 2019.

Medal table

Medalists

Kyorugi

Poomsae

References

External links
Official website (archive)

2019 South Asian Games
Events at the 2019 South Asian Games
2019
South Asian Games